Birrong railway station is located on the Bankstown line, serving the Sydney suburb of Birrong. It is served by Sydney Trains T3 Bankstown line services.

History
Birrong station opened on 16 July 1928, when the Bankstown line was extended from Bankstown to Regents Park. To the north of the station lies Sefton Park Junction with services heading north to Lidcombe and west to Liverpool on the Main South line. The Bankstown line also passes over the Southern Sydney Freight Line. Birrong is now a key interchange station on the Bankstown Line for passengers travelling along the Liverpool via Regents Park route due to the removal of services from this route on 20 October 2013.

In 2020, following the NSW Legislative Council Inquiry into Sydenham to Bankstown line conversion's review of Transport for NSW plans to close stations in the west of Bankstown, the NSW Government announced a Bankstown to Lidcombe shuttle service would operate in the short-term through Birrong once Sydney Metro Southwest opened in 2024.

Uncertaintly remains regarding the long-term future of Birrong Station with the NSW Government Future Transport Strategy 2056 (November 2020 Edition) outlining the proposed Parramatta to Kogarah via Bankstown line to operate via a new corridor from Chester Hill to Bankstown.

In July 2021 an upgrade to the station was complete with a new lift and staircase. And in September 2022, Transport for NSW mistakenly identified Leightonfield instead of Birrong as the interchange between the T3 Bankstown Line branches to Lidcombe and Liverpool.

Platforms & services

Layout

References

External links

Birrong station details Transport for New South Wales

Railway stations in Sydney
Railway stations in Australia opened in 1928
Bankstown railway line
City of Canterbury-Bankstown